"Keep Away" is a song by American rock band Godsmack. It was released as the second single from the band's album Godsmack. An acoustic version was included on The Other Side. A live version is included on the album from Woodstock 1999.

The song brought early attention to the band: "With driving guitars, a sinister sounding vocal and aggressive chorus, the song connected with listeners and the Godsmack ascension was starting to take place. The song would impact radio in June 1999 and followed a more direct trajectory up the charts". The song's writer, band member Sully Erna, described the song as being "about hope -- hope to get the bitch out of my life".

Track listing

Chart positions

References

External links

Godsmack songs
1999 singles
Songs written by Sully Erna
1996 songs
Republic Records singles